Rhian Cleverly (born 11 January 1995) is a Welsh footballer who plays as defender and midfielder for Lewes. She has a single appearance with the Wales national team.

Early life, youth and college career
Cleverly was born in Griffithstown.  She joined the Bristol Academy (now Bristol City W.F.C.) Centre of Excellence. At Bristol, Cleverly progressed through the academy and youth ranks, and captained the reserved side to an FA Reserve Cup title in 2013. She also played for her secondary school, West Monmouth School in Torfaen, South Wales.

Cleverly played for the women's soccer team at Hofstra University in the United States from 2013 to 2017, and was named to Colonial Athletic Association all-rookie team in 2014. She finished her collegiate career with 64 appearances and 1 goal. While at Hofstra, she returned to Bristol for a short spell in 2016.

Senior career
Following graduation from Hofstra, Cleverly joined Le Havre (HAC) in the French 2nd division in June 2018. She started 19 of her 20 league appearances, scoring three goals, and added two more appearances in the Coupe de France Féminine.

In July 2019, Cleverly joined Lewes in the FA Women's Championship after a season at Le Havre. She made 11 starts in 12 matches of the 2019–20 season.  In the 2020 offseason, Cleverly signed a new two-year contract and was named the senior team captain for the 2019–20 season. She scored her first goal for Lewes in a 1-0 win against Coventry United on 27 September 2020.

In 2021 her record as a player led Lewes to sign a new deal with her and her team mate Tatiana Saunders.

International career
Cleverly has represented Wales through the youth levels and played at the 2013 UEFA Women's Under-19 Championship. She earned her first senior cap for Wales in July 2014.

References

External links

1995 births
Living people
Wales women's international footballers
Welsh women's footballers
Hofstra Pride women's soccer players
Expatriate women's soccer players in the United States
Welsh expatriate sportspeople in the United States
Welsh expatriate sportspeople in France
Expatriate women's footballers in France
Lewes F.C. Women players
Women's association football defenders
Women's association football midfielders
Le Havre AC players
Bristol City W.F.C. players
Bristol Academy W.F.C. players
Footballers from Pontypool